Aero Jet Express Internacional SA de CV is a Mexican airline based in Mexico City.

History
The airline was established in 2005 and started operations on December 30. It operates charter flights from Mexico City and Monterrey.
It operated charter flights from Mexico City and Monterrey, but ceased operations in Apr2006, pending re-financing. However, this never happened and the airline was grounded indefinitely. In Dec2007, DGAC finally removed the airline license and it ceased to exist

Services
From Mexico City:Buenos Aires, Paris, Frankfurt
From Acapulco:Cardiff, Birmingham

Fleet
Aero Jet Express operated a fleet of 2 Boeing 757-200 delivered in December 2005.

References

External links
DGAC, October 2007. Info

Defunct airlines of Mexico
Airlines established in 2005
Airlines disestablished in 2007